Baccano! is a 2007 anime series directed by Takahiro Omori and produced by Brain's Base and Aniplex. The 16 episodes are adapted from the light novels of the same name written by Ryohgo Narita and illustrated by Katsumi Enami. Told in out-of-order sequences, the story spans three consecutive years of Prohibition-era America during which three seemingly unconnected events occur: two bottles of immortality elixir are passed around Manhattan by gangsters believing it is alcohol, a supposed monster massacres members of two gangs attempting to hijack the transcontinental train Flying Pussyfoot, and a missing man is tracked down by his sister and a gang. The first thirteen episodes aired in Japan from July 26, 2007, to November 1, 2007, on WOWOW, a Japanese pay-per-view station, and the final three were released direct-to-DVD. The series made its North American television debut when it started airing on the Funimation Channel after the channel transitioned to HD in September 2010.

Eight DVD compilations were released by Aniplex, each containing two episodes, with the first released on October 24, 2007, and the eighth on May 28, 2008. A Blu-ray boxset was released January 26, 2011. On July 21, 2008, the English adaptation of Baccano! was licensed by Funimation. They released four DVD compilations, each containing four episodes, with the first released on January 27, 2009, and the fourth on June 16, 2009. A complete DVD collection boxset was released December 29, 2009, and re-released on December 28, 2010, as part of a lower-priced Viridian Collection. A limited edition Blu-ray boxset was released May 17, 2011; the Blu-ray set was later rereleased on July 31, 2012. The entire English-dubbed series was streamed through Hulu during October 2009 and English-subtitled episodes although once available for streaming, have been removed as of December 2017. Funimation streams English-subtitled and English-dubbed episodes through their website. In Australia and New Zealand, the series is licensed by Madman Entertainment, who released the series over four DVDs between June 24, 2009, and October 21, 2009. A boxset was released on March 17, 2010. Baccano! is licensed in the United Kingdom by Manga Entertainment and was released in a complete boxset on October 11, 2010. The series is aired in the Philippines, Hong Kong and Southeast Asia on Animax Asia.

Two pieces of theme music were used for the series. "Gun's & Roses", performed by Paradise Lunch, was used as the opening theme for all 16 episodes, and Kaori Oda's "Calling" was used as the ending theme. The two themes were released as singles on August 22, 2007. An original soundtrack titled "Spiral Melodies" was released October 24, 2007.



Episode list

Notes

References 
General

 
 
 

Specific

Baccano!
Baccano!